Portos e Caminhos de Ferro de Moçambique (abbreviated CFM; in English Mozambique Ports and Railways)  is a state-owned company that oversees the railway system of Mozambique and its connected ports.

The rail system is composed of a total of 2,983 km rail of the  gauge that is compatible with neighboring rail systems. In addition there is a 140 km line of  gauge, the Gaza Railway.

The system developed over more than a century from three different ports at the Indian Ocean that serve as terminals for separate lines to the hinterland. The railroads were major targets during the Mozambican Civil War, were sabotaged by RENAMO, and are being rehabilitated. Management has been largely outsourced.  At this time there is no directly interconnecting rail service between the three lines.  Each line has its own development corridor.

In August 2010, Mozambique and Botswana signed a memorandum of understanding to develop a 1,100 km railway through Zimbabwe, to carry coal from Serule in Botswana to a deepwater port at Techobanine Point in Mozambique.

Nacala railroad / CFM Norte 

The seaport of Nacala is the terminal of the Nacala railway, the most recent addition to the railway system. Construction of the railway began in 1915 at the port of Lumbo, but money ran out and construction stalled at Monapo. When construction resumed, and it was decided that Nacala should be the seaport terminus and a branch was built between Monapo and Nacala. By 1932 the railway reached 350 km from Nacala to Mutivasse, and by 1950 it extended to Nova Freixo (present-day Cuamba), 538 km from Nacala. An additional 46 km were constructed northwestwards to Vila Cabral (present-day Lichinga). In 1970, the government of Malawi completed a link between Nova Freixo and Nkaya Junction in Malawi, where it connected to Malawi Railways' main north-south railway line. The Nacala line was a longer but more direct route from Malawi to the sea than the older Sena line to Beira, and most Malawian freight traffic shifted to the Nacala line. The line was closed in 1984, when RENAMO rebels blew up a portion of the line during the Mozambican Civil War.

The Mozambican government began rehabilitation of the line in November 2005.  The railway system is operated by Northern Development Corridor. Vale bought a stake in the operator in 2010 and planned a new link from Moatize, where Vale has coal mines, east to Nkaya Junction, connecting there to the existing line to Nacala. It was constructed as the Nacala Logistics Corridor, and was completed in 2017. The project included a coal export terminal and coal storage yard at the port of Nacala-a-Velha.

Beira railroad / CFM Centro 

Beira is the terminal of the Beira railroad, the oldest railway system of  Mozambique.  Its Machipanda line goes to Bulawayo and was opened in 1899 as  link to then Rhodesia, now Zimbabwe, and its transits.  The Sena line of the Beira railroad connects to the coal fields of Moatize with the potential to link to the railway of Malawi as well as to Zambia. As the Beira Railroad Corporation (CCFB) the Beira railway is leased from CFM to the Indian RITES Ltd. and Ircon International consortium.

Maputo railroad / CFM Sul 

Maputo, formerly Lourenço Marques, and Matola are the terminals of the Maputo line that links to north-eastern part of South Africa. Like the Ressano Garcia Railway Company, the Pretoria-Maputo line is managed by the NLBP (New Limpopo Bridge Project Investments) together with Transnet Freight Rail and CPM with the aim to rehabilitate and operate the line to the border of South Africa.  In South Africa the link goes to Komatipoort and further to Johannesburg. The Maputo line also links to Eswatini Railways and the National Railways of Zimbabwe.

Rail links to adjacent countries 
 Malawi on Nacala railway in operation; link to Sena Line
 South Africa yes - same gauge -  - Pretoria–Maputo railway
 Eswatini yes - same gauge -  - Goba railway
 Tanzania no direct link - break of gauge - /
 Zambia no direct link, Nacala railway passes first through Malawi.
 Zimbabwe yes - same gauge - , from Beira (Beira–Bulawayo railway) and from Maputo (Limpopo railway)

See also 

 Filipe Nyusi, current president of Mozambique was executive director of CMF-Norte, the northern division of the company, in 1995
 Economy of Mozambique
 History of rail transport in Mozambique
 Transport in Mozambique
 Railway stations in Mozambique

References

Notes

Further reading 
The African phoenix Trains January 2010

External links 

 CFM Home page
 UN Map
 A luta continua! Railway Gazette International June 2004

Railway companies of Mozambique
Transport in Mozambique
Water transport in Mozambique
3 ft 6 in gauge railways in Mozambique